Sellur K. Raju  is an Indian politician and incumbent Member of the Tamil Nadu legislative assembly for the Madurai West constituency since 2011. He represents the AIADMK party. This was his first election and he won by securing 59 percentage of vote in Madurai west Constituency. He was the minister for Co-operation, which includes Co-operation, Statistics and Ex-service welfare.

Personal life 

Raju lives in Madurai, Tamil Nadu. He has a B.Sc. degree from Kamaraj University. Raju  was admitted to MIOT Hospital-Chennai on July 8, 2020 for COVID-19 treatment, has made a complete recovery. He was discharged from the hospital on July 17.

Political career
He first won the Madurai (West) constituency in the state legislative elections in 2011 and has represented the party since. In 2016, Raju ran on a ticket, where he promised to turn Madurai into Sydney in a matter of 18 months as part of a smart city mission.

He publicly stated his admiration for Rajinikanth when Rajinikanth had finally announced his political plunge in 2018. Later, he stated that Rajinikanth might be able to win over Karaikudi aachi (elderly woman) but not Tamil Nadu aatchi (regime).

Thermocol Controversy 
In 2017, Raju used thermocol sheets to float in the Vaigai reservoir to conserve water. He had said that ₹10 lakh had been allocated for the experiment to cover a portion of the dam in order to reduce water loss due to evaporation. The sheets were swept away by strong winds just moments after Raju set pieces of polystyrene afloat. Social media reacted quickly, mocking him and the officials for coming up with such an idea.

References

All India Anna Dravida Munnetra Kazhagam politicians
Living people
State cabinet ministers of Tamil Nadu
Year of birth missing (living people)
Tamil Nadu MLAs 2011–2016
Tamil Nadu MLAs 2016–2021
Tamil Nadu MLAs 2021–2026